The Motorola Aura (styled AURA) is a series of luxury mobile phones from Motorola, which is part of the 4LTR line. The series was announced in October 2008 and made available for purchase by December of that year. Though originally intended to be a series, only one phone, the Aura R1, was ultimately released. However, three additional special editions of the Aura R1 were released throughout 2009: the Aura Diamoniqe Edition, Aura Celestial Edition and Aura Diamond Edition. The Aura was marketed as a luxury device, with a price tag of US$2000. It was made from premium materials such as stainless steel and sapphire, in order to appeal to a larger audience and was packaged in a wooden box. 

The AURA phone features a circular display with a high resolution of 300dpi. The user interface is specifically designed for this circular display, using the MotoMagx operating system from Motorola. One of the device's unique features is its swivel-like opening mechanism. This mechanism is made possible by the use of Swiss-made gears made of Rockwell 50-55 hardened steel and 130 precision ball bearings. The screen on the AURA is capable of displaying a wide range of colors, with a capability of 26 million different colors.



R1

The R1 was announced in October 2008, and put in production in December 2008. The launch price was approximately €1,420 (UK£1,200, over $2000) due to its premium materials and packaging. The phone featured GSM technology, 2GB of internal memory and an optimised user interface for its circular display, which was a 1.55" screen with a high resolution of 300dpi.

Two Aura special editions were announced at Mobile World Congress 2009: Diamoniqe Edition and Gold Edition. Both of these were styled by luxury designer Alexander Amosu. The Diamoniqe Edition was adorned with 90 diamonds around the circular display whereas the Gold Edition featured a 24-carat gold-plated housing. Both editions received a limited release due to its exclusivity.

Due to the 40th anniversary of the moon landing in which Motorola had collaborated with the equipment that enabled the Apollo 11 astronauts to communicate with Earth, Motorola released a special edition in July, 2009 to celebrate that accomplishment. It comes with exclusive pre-loaded pictures, audio and video content, given by NASA. The handset comes with a laser made inscription and 9 post stamps to commemorate the mission. The first unit produced was gifted to Neil Armstrong.

October, 2009 saw the release of Aura Diamond Edition, a device upgrade with 18 carat gold plating and 34 diamonds around its screen and navigation buttons. Due to the more premium materials, it had a US$5,730 price tag at launch. Both the Diamond and Celestial editions were showcased at Mobile World Congress 2010.

Features
Color: Silver only (Stainless steel).
Vibrating alert.
Ringtones:Polyphonic and MP3.
Bluetooth: Yes
USB: 2.0 Hi-Speed
Camera: 2 MP with video.
JAVA: Yes, MIDP 2.0
Video player: Yes, supports MPEG-4/3gp
Standby: 410h.
Talk time: Up to 7 h 20 min
16 M colors circular display
GPRS Class 12
EDGE Class 12
Installed games: RealDice Chess, RealDice Backgammon
SMS,EMS,MMS
Vufone installed for synchronization.

References

Mobile phones introduced in 2008
Aura